Melanostoma scalare, the chequered hoverfly, is a very common species of hoverfly.

Taxonomy
The European Melanostoma species are not well understood at present. Van der Goot is the most certain identification work. The male genitalia of M. scalare are figured by Dusek and Laska (1967). Other, more accessible, works are listed below.

Distribution
This species is present in most of Europe,  the Near East,  North Africa, and the eastern parts of the Afrotropical realm south to Zimbabwe and throughout the Indomalayan realm to New Guinea.

Description
These hoverflies have a shining black thorax. The males are longer and slimmer than the females. Also, the male's abdomen is much thinner than that of the female. Further, the yellow markings of the male are roundish or diamond-shaped, while those of the female are triangular patches.

Biology
Little is known of its biology, but it is suspected to be general predator of small insects in leaf litter. Adults fly from April to November and inhabit gardens, meadows, and flowering bushes where they feed. The larvae are aphidiphagous.

Gallery

References

External links
External images

Syrphinae
Diptera of Africa
Diptera of Asia
Diptera of Europe
Insects described in 1794
Taxa named by Johan Christian Fabricius